Gregory George Dubinetz (born April 15, 1954) was a former American football guard in the National Football League for the Washington Redskins.  He played college football at Yale University and was drafted in the ninth round of the 1975 NFL Draft by the Cincinnati Bengals. He also played for the Charlotte Hornets, Toronto Argonauts and Hamilton Tiger-Cats. He was killed in an automobile accident in 1982.

References 

1954 births
1982 deaths
American football offensive guards
Canadian football offensive linemen
Yale Bulldogs football players
Charlotte Hornets (WFL) players
Toronto Argonauts players
Hamilton Tiger-Cats players
Washington Redskins players
Players of American football from Chicago
Road incident deaths in the United States